The Ghetto Kids formally known as Triplets Ghetto Kids is a dance group founded in 2014 by Daouda Kavuma and composed of children from the Katwe slum in Kampala, Uganda. They have been on major platforms across the world. Like they featured on French Montana's song,  UNFORGETTABLE  They performed on World cup opening events in Qatar. They even attended a PSG game with star Mbappé

History 
In 2014, Alex, Fred, Bachir, Patricia and Isaac film themselves while dancing to Eddy Kenzo's Sitya Loss music. The video accumulates more than 8 million views in a few weeks on Youtube and social networks. Singer Eddy Kenzo later said "I did not know about this clip until a friend told me about it.“ The singer later invited them to participate in the official videoclip of the song that was released in September of that same year. This collaboration marked the beginning of the Ghetto Kids and allowed the children to go back to school and Daouda Kavuma to buy equipment to develop the group. He composes and produces several pieces of music for the group that toured Africa and the UK in the following months.

On November 30, 2015, 14-year-old Alex died as a result of a bicycle accident. Despite this death, the group continues its tours throughout Africa. The group provokes the admiration of American artists like P. Diddy and Nicky Minaj and in 2017, a featuring in the clip of French Montana's Unforgettable begins their success in the United States.

In January 2023, the Ghetto Kids travelled to France to perform at half-time during football club Paris Saint-Germain's home game against Reims at the Parc des Princes. They also met PSG players such as Kylian Mbappé prior to the match.

Collaborations
In 2014, the Ghettos Kids dance for the video of Sitya Loss by Eddy Kenzo.

In 2015, they dance again for Eddy Kenzo in Jambole.

In 2017, the Ghettos Kids were featured in the music video for French Montana's single "Unforgettable".

References

Living people
Ugandan musical groups
Musical groups established in 2014
Year of birth missing (living people)
2014 establishments in Uganda